The Law–Citizenship–Rights Movement, abbreviated QMH (from the English transliteration qiyyam, muwatana, huqouq), also known as Teyar El-Qemih (from the Arabic acronym), and translated as Wheat Wave Movement, is a democratic secular multi-ethnic political party established in 2015 in northern Syria.

Elected representatives
The Law–Citizenship–Rights Movement currently has three members on the General Federal Assembly of the Syrian Democratic Council (SDC), Salih El-Nebwanî, Majid Hebu (also written Macid Hebo) and Haytham Manna who was a co-leader of the assembly. Manna resigned his leadership role from the SDC on 19 March 2016 in protest at the council's announcement of a federal system for Northern Syria, i.e. at the creation of Rojava.

References

2015 establishments in Syria
Political parties established in 2015
Political parties in Syria
Political parties in the Autonomous Administration of North and East Syria